A Better Way to Die is a 2000 action and thriller film. It was directed and produced by Scott Wiper. The film centers on a Chicago cop who quits the force and finds himself threatened by the Mafia.

Cast
Andre Braugher as Cleveland
Natasha Henstridge as Kelly
Scott Wiper as Boomer
Jack Conley as Fletcher
Carmen Argenziano as Carlos
Richard Haje as The Mute
Mo Gallini as Laslov (as Matt Gallini)
Rolando Molina as Chach
Kirk McKinney as Spaz
Jefferson Moore as Harrison James
Wayne Duvall as Rifkin
Lou Diamond Phillips as William Dexter

References

External links

2000 films
2000 action thriller films
Films produced by Bradley Fuller
American action thriller films
Newmarket films
2000s English-language films
2000s American films